The Violent Crime Reduction Act 2006 (c. 38) is an Act of the Parliament of the United Kingdom.

Origin
The United Kingdom Government published a paper "Drinking Responsibly - The Government's Proposals"  in 2005 setting out their proposals for introducing Drinking Banning Orders (DBOs).  Schedule 5 of the act repeals the Licensed Premises (Exclusion of Certain Persons) Act 1980 because the exclusions from certain premises under the provisions of that act are made redundant.

Content
The 66 sections and 5 Schedules of the Violent Crime Reduction Act 2006 cover a wide range of measures. 
 Part 1 of the Act deals with alcohol-related violence and disorder. (ss. 1 to 27)
 Part 2 deals with weapons. (ss. 28 to 51)
 Part 3 deals with a miscellany: football disorder, sexual offences, anti-social behaviour, parenting orders, mobile phone reprogramming, and licensing in relation to sports grounds. It repealed and replaced large sections of the Football Spectators Act 1989. (ss. 52 to 63)
 Part 4 of the Act deals with general housekeeping like expenses and repeals. (ss. 64 to 66)

Commencement
The Violent Crime Reduction Act 2006 (Commencement No. 1) Order 2007 (S.I. 2007/74 (C.3)). This Order brings into force sections 42, 54, 55 and 57 of, and Schedule 4 to, the Violent Crime Reduction Act 2006 on 12 February 2007.  These provisions-
increase the maximum sentences for knife possession offences
provide for the forfeiture and detention of vehicles etc. connected with sexual offences
ensure the continuity of sexual offences law following the Sexual Offences Act 2003 and
amend section 82 of the Sexual Offences Act 2003 (notification periods) for offenders subject to sentences of imprisonment for public protection
The Violent Crime Reduction Act 2006 (Commencement No. 2) Order 2007 (S.I. 2007/858 (C.35)). This Order brings into force on 6 April 2007 the provisions of the Violent Crime Reduction Act 2006 which are listed in article 2 and brings into force on 31 May 2007 the provisions of that Act which are listed in article 3. The provisions in article 3(a) and (b) are only commenced in England.
The Violent Crime Reduction Act 2006 (Commencement No. 3) Order 2007 (S.I. 2007/2180 (C.83)). This Order brings into force on 22 August 2007 section 22 of the Violent Crime Reduction Act 2006. This Order also brings into force on 1 October 2007 the provisions of that Act which are listed in article 3 and (to the extent that they are not already in force) article 4.
The Violent Crime Reduction Act 2006 (Commencement No. 4) Order 2007 (S.I. 2007/2518 (C.95)). This Order brings into force on 1 October 2007 section 41 of the Violent Crime Reduction Act 2006. This Order also brings into force on 1 October 2007 (to the extent that they are not already in force) the provisions of that Act which are listed in article 3.
The Violent Crime Reduction Act 2006 (Commencement No. 5) Order 2008 (S.I. 2008/791 (C.38))
The Violent Crime Reduction Act 2006 (Commencement No. 6) Order 2008 (S.I. 2008/1407 (C.62))
The Violent Crime Reduction Act 2006 (Commencement No. 7) Order 2009 (S.I. 2009/1840 (C.89))
The Violent Crime Reduction Act 2006 (Commencement No. 8) Order 2010 (S.I. 2010/469 (C.33))
The Violent Crime Reduction Act 2006 (Commencement No. 9) Order 2010 (S.I. 2010/2541 (C.121))
The Violent Crime Reduction Act 2006 (Commencement No. 1) (Wales) Order 2010 (S.I. 2010/2426 (W.208) (C.119))

Notes and references

United Kingdom Acts of Parliament 2006
English criminal law